Mungo Park may refer to:

 Mungo Park (explorer) (1771–1806), Scottish explorer
 Mungo Park (golfer) (1836–1904), Scottish golfer
 Mungo Park Jr. (1877–1960), pioneer in South American golf
 Mungo Park (theatre), a theater in Denmark
 Mungo Park Medal, an award
 Mungo National Park, an Australian park
 "Mungo Park", a 2016 Nigerian song by Korede Bello

See also
 John Mungo-Park (1918–1941), British Second World War fighter pilot

Park, Mungo